Entreculturas is a non-governmental organization for development cooperation, the international social outreach of the Spanish Province of Jesuits, founded in Madrid in 1985. It focuses mainly on educating the poor in Latin America and Africa, while responding to humanitarian crises and also educating to global awareness in Spain.

Activities
In Latin America and Africa, Entreculturas supports initiatives that promote education of the disadvantaged, ranging from teacher training and building classrooms and vocational training centres, to supporting educational programs on radio, to nutritional programs.

Entreculturas offers free educational resources in Spanish on line, as well as informative videos. It sends volunteers abroad for insertion experiences, to places like an orphanage in Nairobi, Kenya.

External links
Entreculturas website, Spanish 
Deputy Director explains Entreculturas

References

Jesuit development centres
Organizations established in 1985
Non-profit organisations based in Spain
Cultural promotion organizations
International educational charities
Christian refugee aid organizations
1985 establishments in Spain